The 2017 season was Western New York Flash's tenth season, and the first in which they competed in the United Women's Soccer league in the second division of women's soccer in the United States. It was an almost entirely different team from the prior season's, which competed in the top-division National Women's Soccer League before being sold and moved to North Carolina.

First-team squad 

Florida State University forward Maddie Pezzino was the newly reformed club's first signing.

Source: UWS

Match results

Regular season

The Flash announced their schedule on March 11, 2016.

Standings

References

External links

See also
 2017 United Women's Soccer season

Western New York Flash seasons
Western New York Flash
Western New York Flash
Western New York Flash